Kickapoo Township is located in Peoria County, Illinois. As of the 2010 census, its population was 7,158 and it contained 3,005 housing units. Kickapoo Township changed its name from Orange Township on an unknown date, but the best guess is 1850.

Geography

Demographics

References

External links
City-data.com
Illinois State Archives

Townships in Peoria County, Illinois
Peoria metropolitan area, Illinois
Townships in Illinois